Chrysocrambus kobelti is a moth in the family Crambidae. It was described by Saalmüller in 1885. It is found in North Africa, including Algeria and Morocco.

References

Crambinae
Moths described in 1885